Thomas Adolphus Bowden (26 July 1824 – 24 June 1906) was an English-born New Zealand Anglican clergyman, farmer, teacher and educationalist. He was born in London on 26 July 1824.

References

1824 births
1906 deaths
New Zealand farmers
New Zealand educators
New Zealand Anglicans
English emigrants to New Zealand
New Zealand geographers